Gerardo Martín Gómez Fonseca (born 11 January 1989) is a Mexican professional footballer who currently plays for Irapuato. he is known as Kalu by fans and commentators, he is one of the most capped Irapuato FC players with 124 caps as of 2012.

Career
Gómez was signed by Mexican Primera División side Chiapas, but did not appear for the club and was loaned to Irapuato FC.

Honours

Club
Irapuato
 Liga de Ascenso: Clausura 2011
 Liga de Ascenso runner up: Apertura 2008, Apertura 2009

References

External links

1989 births
Living people
Footballers from Guanajuato
People from Irapuato
Irapuato F.C. footballers
Mexican footballers
Association football wingers